Ricardo Monteiro (born 2 October 1985) is a Portuguese former sprinter. He represented his country in the 4 × 100 metres relay at the 2009 and 2011 World Championships without qualifying for the final.

International competitions

Personal bests

Outdoor
100 metres – 10.30 (+1.0 m/s, Salamanca 2013)
200 metres – 21.97 (+1.5 m/s, Seixal 2006)
Indoor
60 metres – 6.72 (Lisbon 2013)
200 metres – 21.96 (Pombal 2010)

References

1985 births
Living people
Portuguese male sprinters
S.L. Benfica athletes